Vruć vetar (Serbian Cyrillic: Врућ ветар) is one of the most popular Yugoslav TV series that aired in 1980. The show and movie cut from scenes of the show (Avanture Borivoja Šurdilovića (Serbian Cyrillic: Авантуре Боривоја Шурдиловића, English: The Adventures of Borivoje Šurdilović)) were also popular in neighbouring countries (Hungary, Romania and Bulgaria, as well as in Czechoslovakia). The main theme (titled "A sad adio", "Now it's time to say goodbye", performed - among others - by Slavko Bešić Čupa and by Dragan Stojnić) became very popular and is enjoying a bit of a cult status.

Plot
The show follows the adventures of Šurda, a man in his mid 30s from Vlasotince who comes to Belgrade to work and get rich. In Belgrade he lives in a small house with his granny and uncle Firga, a retired mason. Šurda buys a local barbershop, but this job doesn't suit him, so Šurda sells the barbershop and buys a car to become a taxi driver. He is not successful in this job either, so Šurda, after listening to Bob's story about better life abroad, decides to become gastarbeiter, a guest worker in Germany.
But none of the jobs he finds are right for him, so he is forced to return to Yugoslavia. Here, he meets Vesna, an attractive stewardess, and the couple eventually get married. Firga succeeds in employing Šurda in his former construction firm. There, Šurda, with a little cheating, wins a flat that the company gives for its own workers, but after some internal problems within the company, Šurda is forced to fight for the flat. Eventually, Firga is awarded a new flat, so the whole family settle to a new home and they find that their new flat is occupied by Pera, a homeless chemist.

Cast
 Ljubiša Samardžić — Borivoje Šurdilović "Šurda"
 Bora Todorović — Slobodan Mihajlović "Bob", Šurda's friend and "partner"
 Miodrag Petrović Čkalja — Blagoje Popović "Firga", Šurda's uncle
 Radmila Savićević — Šurda's Granny
 Žika Milenković — Sotir Šurdilović "Soća", Šurda's father
 Vesna Čipčić — Vesna Šurdilović, Šurda's wife
 Ljubica Ković — Šurda's mother
 Dragomir Bojanić Gidra — Krstivoje, Šurda's partner
 Čedomir Petrović — Pera

Episode list
 Čovek na pogresnom mestu (A Man in the Wrong Place) — 6 January 1980
 Taksista (A Taxidriver) — 13 January 1980
 Gastarbajter (Gastarbeiter) — 20 January 1980
 Kobni susret (The Fatal Encounter) — 27 January 1980
 Bračni vir (Marriage Whirl) — 3 February 1980
 Stan (Flat) — 10 February 1980
 Na barikadama (On Barricades) — 17 February 1980
 Pronalazak (The Invention) — 24 February 1980
 Brodolom (Shipwreck) — 3 March 1980
 Šampion (The Champion) — 10 March 1980

External links 
 
 

Radio Television of Serbia original programming
1980 Yugoslav television series debuts
1980 Yugoslav television series endings
Serbian comedy television series
Serbian-language television shows
1980s Yugoslav television series
Television shows set in Belgrade
Television shows set in Serbia
Television shows filmed in Serbia
Television shows filmed in Belgrade